Hi-Nella is a borough in Camden County, in the U.S. state of New Jersey. The borough is the state's ninth-smallest municipality. As of the 2020 United States census, the borough's population was 927, an increase of 57 (+6.6%) from the 2010 census count of 870, which in turn reflected a decline of 159 (−15.5%) from the 1,029 counted in the 2000 census.

The Borough of Hi-Nella was created on April 23, 1929, from portions of Clementon Township, as one of seven municipalities created from the now-defunct township, and one of five new municipalities (joining Lindenwold, Pine Hill, Pine Valley and Somerdale) created on that same date. The borough's name is traditionally said to derive from a Native American term meaning "high rolling knoll" or "high ground", though it may have been named for Nella, the wife of Lucious Parker, who developed Hi-Nella Estates in the late 1920s.

The Star-Ledger included Hi-Nella in its 2010 series of articles covering "Towns that Shouldn't Exist", citing the borough's small area, population and staff, along with its use of a double-wide trailer as a municipal building. Mayor Meredith Dobbs told The Star-Ledger that efforts to force the borough to consolidate with its neighbors would be "declared dead on arrival".

The borough had the fifth-highest property tax rate in New Jersey, with an equalized rate of 5.306% in 2020, compared to 3.470% in the county as a whole and a statewide average of 2.279%.

Geography
According to the United States Census Bureau, the borough had a total area of 0.22 square miles (0.58 km2), all of which was land.

Hi-Nella borders the Camden County municipalities of Gloucester Township, Somerdale and Stratford.

Demographics

2010 census

The Census Bureau's 2006–2010 American Community Survey showed that (in 2010 inflation-adjusted dollars) median household income was $45,469 (with a margin of error of +/− $4,794) and the median family income was $53,750 (+/− $15,403). Males had a median income of $37,222 (+/− $14,117) versus $38,804 (+/− $7,870) for females. The per capita income for the borough was $23,678 (+/− $3,470). About 13.5% of families and 13.7% of the population were below the poverty line, including 26.0% of those under age 18 and 5.9% of those age 65 or over.

2000 census
As of the 2000 United States census there were 1,029 people, 472 households, and 260 families residing in the borough. The racial makeup of the borough was 71.04% White, 19.24% African American, 3.11% Asian, 4.37% from other races, and 2.24% from two or more races. Hispanic or Latino of any race were 6.90% of the population.

There were 472 households, out of which 28.0% had children under the age of 18 living with them, 31.6% were married couples living together, 16.3% had a female householder with no husband present, and 44.9% were non-families. 36.4% of all households were made up of individuals, and 9.3% had someone living alone who was 65 years of age or older. The average household size was 2.18 and the average family size was 2.83.

In the borough the population was spread out, with 25.0% under the age of 18, 10.5% from 18 to 24, 36.3% from 25 to 44, 14.5% from 45 to 64, and 13.7% who were 65 years of age or older. The median age was 32 years. For every 100 females, there were 89.2 males. For every 100 females age 18 and over, there were 87.8 males.

The median income for a household in the borough was $34,948, and the median income for a family was $38,393. Males had a median income of $32,308 versus $25,759 for females. The per capita income for the borough was $19,285. About 9.9% of families and 12.2% of the population were below the poverty line, including 10.7% of those under age 18 and 6.3% of those age 65 or over.

Government

Local government
Hi-Nella is governed under the Borough form of New Jersey municipal government, one of 218 municipalities (of the 564) statewide that use this form, which is the state's most common form of government. The governing body is comprised of the Mayor and the six-member Borough Council, with all positions elected at-large on a partisan basis as part of the November general election. A Mayor is elected directly by the voters to a four-year term of office. The Borough Council is comprised of six members elected to serve three-year terms on a staggered basis, with three seats coming up for election in odd-numbered years in a three-year cycle. The Borough form of government used by Hi-Nella is a "weak mayor / strong council" government in which council members act as the legislative body with the mayor presiding at meetings and voting only in the event of a tie. The mayor can veto ordinances subject to an override by a two-thirds majority vote of the council. The mayor makes committee and liaison assignments for council members, and most appointments are made by the mayor with the advice and consent of the council.

, the mayor of Hi-Nella is Democrat Michael J. Segeren, whose term of office ends December 31, 2023. Members of the Borough Council are Jose A. Class (R, 2024), Cindy McCoy (D, 2023), Kris Muska (I, 2024), Harry Uber (R, 2023) and Robert Wise (D, 2025).

Federal, state and county representation
Hi-Nella is located in the 1st Congressional District and is part of New Jersey's 6th state legislative district. Prior to the 2011 reapportionment following the 2010 Census, Hi-Nella had been in the 5th state legislative district.

Politics
As of March 2011, there were a total of 571 registered voters in Hi-Nella, of which 252 (44.1%) were registered as Democrats, 59 (10.3%) were registered as Republicans and 260 (45.5%) were registered as Unaffiliated. There were no voters registered to other parties.

In the 2012 presidential election, Democrat Barack Obama received 66.1% of the vote (213 cast), ahead of Republican Mitt Romney with 30.4% (98 votes), and other candidates with 3.4% (11 votes), among the 326 ballots cast by the borough's 645 registered voters (4 ballots were spoiled), for a turnout of 50.5%. In the 2008 presidential election, Democrat Barack Obama received 67.5% of the vote (249 cast), ahead of Republican John McCain, who received around 29.3% (108 votes), with 369 ballots cast among the borough's 529 registered voters, for a turnout of 69.8%. In the 2004 presidential election, Democrat John Kerry received 61.9% of the vote (216 ballots cast), outpolling Republican George W. Bush, who received around 37.5% (131 votes), with 349 ballots cast among the borough's 497 registered voters, for a turnout percentage of 70.2.

In the 2013 gubernatorial election, Republican Chris Christie received 59.6% of the vote (99 cast), ahead of Democrat Barbara Buono with 36.7% (61 votes), and other candidates with 3.6% (6 votes), among the 171 ballots cast by the borough's 658 registered voters (5 ballots were spoiled), for a turnout of 26.0%. In the 2009 gubernatorial election, Republican Chris Christie received 46.6% of the vote (90 ballots cast), ahead of both Democrat Jon Corzine with 46.1% (89 votes) and Independent Chris Daggett with 4.1% (8 votes), with 193 ballots cast among the borough's 544 registered voters, yielding a 35.5% turnout.

Education
Hi-Nella is a non-operating school district. For pre-kindergarten through eighth grade, public school students from Hi-Nella attend school in Stratford as part of a sending/receiving relationship with the Stratford School District that was phased in over a five-year period starting in 2012–2013. As of the 2018–19 school year, the district, comprised of two schools, had an enrollment of 862 students and 69.1 classroom teachers (on an FTE basis), for a student–teacher ratio of 12.5:1. Schools in the district (with 2018–19 enrollment data from the National Center for Education Statistics) are
Parkview Elementary School with 367 students in pre-kindergarten through third grade and
Samuel S. Yellin Elementary School with 487 students in grades 4–8.

Prior to the 2012–2013 changeover, Hi-Nella students in K–8 had attended the Oaklyn Public School District. With Hi-Nella ending its sending/receiving relationship under a phase-out that would see all Hi-Nella students out of Oaklyn's school by 2016–2017, the Oaklyn district saw overall enrollment decline from 469 in 2011–2012 to 384 in 2014–2015, resulting in the loss of tuition revenue that had accounted for as much as 10% of Oaklyn's budget, causing significant strain on the district's budget.

For ninth grade through twelfth grade, public school students attend Sterling High School, a regional high school district that serves students from Magnolia, Somerdale and Stratford, along with the sending districts of Hi-Nella and Laurel Springs. The high school is located in Somerdale. As of the 2018–19 school year, the high school had an enrollment of 958 students and 69.8 classroom teachers (on an FTE basis), for a student–teacher ratio of 13.7:1.

Prior to the establishment of this agreement with Sterling in 2012, Hi-Nella students attended Collingswood High School, which is much further away from Hi-Nella.

Transportation

No Interstate, U.S., state or major county highways traverse Hi-Nella. The only numbered routes are minor county roads, such as County Route 727.

References

External links

 Borough website
 Oaklyn Public Schools
 
 School Data for the Oaklyn Public Schools, National Center for Education Statistics
 Sterling High School
 

 
1929 establishments in New Jersey
Borough form of New Jersey government
Boroughs in Camden County, New Jersey
New Jersey District Factor Group none
Populated places established in 1929